William Kincaid may refer to:
 William Kincaid (artist), American costume designer and artist 
 William Kincaid (flutist), American flutist and teacher
 William W. Kincaid, American entrepreneur and inventor
 Woody Kincaid (William Kincaid), American long-distance runner
 Bill Kincaid (William S. Kincaid), American computer engineer and entrepreneur
 Billy Kincaid, a fictional supervillain in the Spawn comic book series
 William Bradley Kincaid, American folk singer and radio entertainer